The 2012 American Le Mans Monterey presented by Patrón was held at Mazda Raceway Laguna Seca on May 12, 2012. It was the third round of the 2012 American Le Mans Series season.

Qualifying

Qualifying results
Pole position winners in each class are marked in bold.

Race

Race result
Class winners in bold.  Cars failing to complete 70% of their class winner's distance are marked as Not Classified (NC).

References

Monterey
Monterey Sports Car Championships
American Le Mans Monterey